Andrei Nikolaevich Mironov (31 March 1954 – 24 May 2014) was a Russian human rights activist, reporter, fixer, interpreter. The Washington Post described him as "the interpreter who tried to save Russia".

Early life 
Mironov was born in the Siberian city of Irkutsk. The family later settled in Izhevsk (renamed Ustinov from 1985 to 1987), the capital of Russia's Udmurtia republic.  Andrei's parents were geophysicists by profession. The family were privately very critical of the Soviet regime, their outlook reflecting the relatively independent attitudes of the Soviet scientific intelligentsia.

One of the main interests in his early years was history studies, young Andrei even interviewed one of the accomplices involved in the assassination of the Royal family. After graduating from secondary school Mironov got a job as a restorer-conservator at the museum of local history. He studied the restoration methods in Tartu.

Later Mironov was drafted for compulsory army service. He served for two years in the anti-aircraft missile troops. In 1974 he returned from service with a damaged nervous system that doctors said will take over a year to restore. Despite this, Andrei managed to pass entry exams and enroll as a student at the Mendeleev Institute of Chemical Technology in Moscow. Finding it too difficult to comply with the Soviet curriculum that included the history of the Communist Party of the USSR, he left within a year.

Samizdat and life of a dissident 
Since 1975 Mironov became closely involved in copying and distributing banned literature or samizdat. Nearly a decade later, in 1984, Mironov was arrested for distributing samizdat and for his contacts with foreigners (mostly students at the Pushkin State Russian Language Institute). Mironov later discovered that he was also suspected by the government of espionage. The lengthy investigation that followed, included extreme interrogations, torture by sleep deprivation and 35 days in an isolation cell or the kartser.

Political prisoner 
In 1985, Mironov was sentenced under Article 70 by the Supreme Court of Udmurtia to four years in a labour camp and three in internal exile. He was sent to a camp for political prisoners in the Dubrovlag chain of camps in Mordovia. In February 1987, however, he was released following pressure from the West.

Career 
After his release Mironov got heavily involved in promotion of human rights and worked tirelessly at helping with the release of the remaining political prisoners. In 1988 Mironov joined the human rights centre ‘Memorial’. He specialised in identifying weapons banned from use in civilian areas such as thermobaric weapons including 'vacuum bombs'. Mironov provided proof after such weapons were illegally used by the military forces. This work often brought him to conflict areas both in Russia and abroad. 
  
Mironov reported from the Russian republic of Chechnya during both wars of 1994 and 1999, and also worked in Afghanistan. He initiated and organised a series of confidential meetings between Russian and Chechen politicians in western Europe with a view to finding a political solution to the Russo-Chechen conflict through the mediation of European diplomats. Throughout his career, Mironov worked with foreign journalists including correspondents of numerous American and European media outlets, covering war and injustice. He had a long-standing friendship and fruitful collaboration with an Italian filmmaker Giorgio Fornoni. Andrei worked as a fixer/producer on a number of Fornoni's documentaries including a film on "Siberian" anthrax.

Mironov had a longstanding interest in Initiatives of Change (formerly called Moral Re-Armament), a movement dedicated to applying moral and spiritual principles in public life that had a record of promoting reconciliation in troubled parts of the world.  Mironov's involvement in it started when he met one of its Norwegian representatives, Leif Hovelsen Leif Hovelsen, on a visit he made to Moscow in April 1989. Hovelsen had been active in the Norwegian Resistance during World War II, before being arrested and tortured by the Gestapo. In prison he had some powerful spiritual experiences—some of which he described in Out of the Evil Night (1959). He believed that it was important not to respond to evil with evil, and after the war embarked on trying to build bridges with Germany. Mironov was impressed by Hovelsen's experience and message, and often translated for him on the many visits he made to Moscow over the next two decades. Another Russian who was supportive of Initiatives of Change was the philosopher Grigory Pomerants, and Mironov translated for him on some of the visits he made to the Initiatives of Change conference centre in Caux, Switzerland. Indeed, he came to admire Pomerants's outlook and philosophy of life.

Attack in Moscow 
Mironov was violently attacked in his home on 3 June 2003 by a former member of the Russian police forces. The attack left him unconscious, with four open wounds as well as serious brain damage, which prevented him from returning to work. On 5 June 2003, two days after the attack, Mironov went to a police station to report what had happened, in order to make sure the offence did not go unpunished and to obtain compensation for the serious harm suffered. In September, Mironov discovered that the police had refused to register his complaint and had decided to clear the person responsible for the attack. In order to denounce this serious failing on the part of the authorities, Viacheslav Igrunov, a member of the Duma at the time, wrote to the Public Prosecutor of Moscow, the Public Prosecutor of the district responsible for the inquiry, and the Chief of Police of Moscow. For its part, the 'Frontline Defenders' human rights association referred the Mironov affair to the Attorney General of Russia. On 6 January 2004, the Russian judicial authorities decided not to pursue the criminal inquiry on the basis of a police report stating that the injuries suffered by Mironov were very slight, despite all the medical files produced by Mironov proving that the injuries were serious. The acts of intimidation against Mironov continued until he was admitted to a neurological clinic in Germany on 11 January 2004. With medical help provided in Europe, Mironov gradually returned to health and resumed his work as a human rights activist, reporter and fixer.

Death 
Mironov's final assignment was to eastern Ukraine. The last article authored by Andrei Mironov accompanied by photographs of his colleague and friend Italian photojournalist Andrea Rocchelli, recorded the trauma of children under fire, before the journalists set off to cover the Presidential Elections in Sloviansk. Both journalists were killed 24 May after apparently being caught in crossfire between separatist fighters and the Ukrainian Army troops near Sloviansk. A French photographer, William Roguelon, the sole survivor of the attack among the reporters, traveling with them, said that the group was targeted by mortars and automatic weapons from the Karachun hill, where the National Guard of Ukraine and the Ukrainian army were stationed. After Mironov's death, social activist and contender for the 2010 Nobel Peace Prize Svetlana Gannushkina described him as a person with a "crystal clear soul, absolute unselfishness, a limitless, uncompromising sense of justice, a remarkable kindness and belief in goodness". The OSCE called for the investigation into the journalists' deaths.

In 2016 the Italian prosecutors opened the inquiries that led to the arrest of Ukrainian and Italian National Guard soldier Vitalii Markiv. On 3 November 2020, the Milan Court of Appeal acquitted Vitalii Markiv of all charges

Mironov is survived by his mother, Yevgeniya Mironova, and two brothers, Alexander and Alexei Mironov.

Awards 
 2008 – Pierre Simon prize for ethics and society. Awarded annually under the auspices of the French Ministry of Health
 2014 – Prize "Camertone" in the name of Anna Politkovskaya, awarded posthumously to journalists for courage and professionalism

References

External links 
 Alice Lagnado, "Killed in Slovyansk, Andrey Mironov Sought Out Truth Despite the Costs", The Moscow Times, 29 May 2014
 "Галерея памяти. Прощальные слова близких об Андрее Миронове", Novaya Gazeta, 30 May 2014
 Kristina Gorelik, "Убит на войне", Radio Svoboda, 11 September 2014
 "Андрей Миронов, политзэк 1986-го, мемориалец, переводчик, погиб под Славянском", Cogita.ru, 27 May 2014
 "Под Славянском убит итальянский журналист и его переводчик, диссидент Андрей Миронов", Newtimes.ru, 25 May 2014
 Sophia Kishkovsky, "Andrei N. Mironov, Soviet-Era Political Prisoner and Activist, Dies at 60", The New York Times, 6 June 2014
 Colin Peck, "Remembering Andrei Mironov" Rory Peck Trust, 27 May 2014
 Olivia Ward, "Death in Ukraine: bitter end for Russian human rights hero", Toronto Daily Star, 25 May 2014

1954 births
2014 deaths
Writers from Irkutsk
Russian prisoners and detainees
Russian human rights activists
Russian journalists
Interpreters
20th-century Russian translators
Deaths by firearm in Ukraine
Journalists killed while covering the war in Donbas
Soviet dissidents
Soviet prisoners and detainees